The day after South African State President F. W. De Klerk announced that the African National Congress (ANC) and other political organisations would be unbanned and Nelson Mandela would be released from prison, a small group of Capetonians took to the streets in an act of guerrilla street theatre. The Rainbow Nation Peace Ritual as it eventually came to be known, was actually planned some ten days before the announcement by the Rainbow People's Party and the ritual, march, celebration or carnival, call it what you will, involved children as well as innocent bystanders who were taken by surprise.

It lasted only for a couple of hours, beginning at the Old Townhouse in Greenmarket Square, Cape Town, proceeded down Shortmarket Street and ended up in St George's Mall.

While the ideal of a new tribe of rainbow people was always a part of South African counter-culture, it was only after Archbishop Desmond Tutu officially "named" the Rainbow Nation, that the phrase became accepted across the board.  However the fact remains, that on February 3, 1990, a cross-cultural mix of hippies, street kids, Rastas and artists, a veritable "band of modern merry pranksters" danced through the streets of Cape Town and invoked the goddess of peace and spirits of abundance to awaken and greet a new age of freedom.

What is also significant about this event, is the willing participation of a banner painted by Beezy Bailey, joined by the anarchist Nat Tardrew, filmographer Nodi Murphy, ecologist and artist Karen Rolfes, performance artist Rehane Abrahams, publisher David Robert Lewis, musician Philip Nangle, an art teacher called "Johno" along with an assortment of characters that appear on a piece of documentary footage shot by Craig Mathews of Doxa Productions.

See also
1990 in South Africa
Purple Rain Protest
Rainbow Nation

External links
http://www.zoopy.com/photo/detail/id/8934

1990 in South Africa
20th century in Cape Town
Civil disobedience
Events associated with apartheid
Protests in South Africa
Events in Cape Town